Lepidoptera of Bermuda consist of both the butterflies and moths recorded from the island of Bermuda.

According to a recent estimate, there are a total of 183 Lepidoptera species present in Bermuda.

Butterflies

Hesperiidae
Calpodes ethlius (Stoll, [1782])
Hylephila phyleus (Drury, 1773)

Nymphalidae
Agraulis vanillae nigrior Michener, 1942
Danaus gilippus berenice (Cramer, 1779)
Danaus plexippus (Linnaeus, 1758)
Junonia coenia bergi Avinoff, 1926
Nymphalis antiopa (Linnaeus, 1758)
Vanessa atalanta rubria (Fruhstorfer, 1909)
Vanessa cardui (Linnaeus, 1758)
Vanessa virginiensis (Drury, 1773)

Papilionidae
Papilio cresphontes Cramer, [1777]

Pieridae
Colias eurytheme Boisduval, 1852
Colias philodice Godart, 1819
Eurema lisa Boisduval & LeConte (1829)
Phoebis sennae eubule (Linnaeus, 1767)
Pieris rapae (Linnaeus, 1758)

Moths

Arctiidae
Cisseps fulvicollis (Hübner, [1818])
Pyrrharctia isabella (JE Smith, 1797)
Utetheisa bella (Linnaeus, 1758)

Blastobasidae
Holcocera guilandinae (Busck, 1900)

Bucculatricidae
Bucculatrix rhombophora Meyrick, 1926

Coleophoridae
Batrachedra decoctor bermudensis Hodges, (1966)
Coleophora anisota Meyrick, 1927
Coleophora texanella Chambers, 1878

Cosmopterigidae
Cosmopterix attenuatella (Walker, 1864)
Cosmopterix pulchrimella Chambers, 1875
Cosmopterix sp. near minutella Bett.
Pyroderces badia (Hodges, 1962)

Crambidae
Achyra rantalis (Guenée, 1854)
Argyria lacteella (Fabricius, 1794)
Ategumia ebulealis (Guenee, 1854)
Crambus quinquareatus Zeller, 1877
Diacme elealis (Walker, 1859)
Diaphania hyalinata (Linnaeus, 1767)
Diaphania nitidalis (Stoll, 1781)
Eustixia pupula Hübner, 1823
Glyphodes sibillalis Walker, 1859
Hellula rogatalis (Hulst, 1886)
Herpetogramma bermudalis (Dyar, 1915)
Herpetogramma bipunctalis (Fabricius, 1794)
Herpetogramma phaeopteralis (Guenée, 1854)
Hymenia perspectalis (Hübner, 1796)
Nomophila nearctica Munroe, 1973
Oenobotys invinacealis Ferguson, Hilburn & Wright, 1991
Oenobotys vinotinctalis (Hampson, 1895)
Palpita kimballi Munroe, 1959
Penestola bufalis (Guenée, 1854)
Pyrausta onythesalis (Walker, 1859)
Rhectocraspeda periusalis (Walker, 1859)
Scoparia jonesalis Dyar, 1915
Spoladea recurvalis (Fabricius, 1775)
Sufetula diminutalis (Walker, 1866)
Syngamia florella (Stoll in Cramer & Stoll, 1781)
Terastia meticulosalis Guenee, 1854
Udea rubigalis (Guenée, 1854)
Uresiphita reversalis (Guenée, 1854)

Elachistidae
Elachista species

Gelechiidae
Dichomeris acuminata (Staudinger, in Kalchberg, 1876)
Keiferia lycopersicella (Walsingham, 1897)
Phthorimaea operculella (Zeller, 1873)
Polyhymno sp. probably luteostrigella Chambers, 1874
Recurvaria annulicornis (Walsingham, 1897)
Stegasta bosqueella (Chambers, 1875)
Symmetrischema striatella (Murtfeldt, 1900)
Taygete parvella (Fabricius, 1794)

Geometridae
Costaconvexa centrostrigaria (Wollaston, 1858)
Cyclophora myrtaria (Guenée, 1857)
Disclisioprocta stellata (Guenée, [1858])
Leptostales crossii (Hulst, 1900)
Leptostales laevitaria (Geyer, 1837)
Leptostales pannaria (Guenée, [1858])
Macaria ochrifascia (Warren, 1897)
Orthonama obstipata (Fabricius, 1794)
Pleuroprucha asthenaria (Walker, 1861)
Pleuroprucha insulsaria (Guenée, 1857)
Synchlora frondaria Guenée, 1857

Gracillariidae
Caloptilia perseae (Busck, 1920)
Caloptilia rhoifoliella (Chambers, 1876)

Hyblaeidae
Hyblaea puera (Cramer, 1777)

Lyonetiidae
Bedellia somnulentella (Zeller, 1847)

Momphidae
Mompha circumscriptella (Zeller, 1873)

Noctuidae
Agrotis ipsilon (Hufnagel, 1766)
Agrotis malefida Guenée, 1852
Amyna axis (Guenée, 1852)
Anicla infecta (Ochsenheimer, 1816)
Anomis editrix (Guenée, 1852)
Anomis erosa Hübner, 1821
Anomis flava fimbriago (Stephens, 1829)
Anticarsia gemmatalis Hübner, 1818
Argyrogramma verruca (Fabricius, 1794)
Ascalapha odorata (Linnaeus, 1758)
Callopistria floridensis (Guenée, 1852)
Chrysodeixis includens (Walker, 1858)
Condica circuita (Guenée, 1852) (possible misidentification)
Condica mobilis (Walker, 1857)
Condica sutor (Guenée, 1852)
Elaphria nucicolora (Guenee, 1852)
Eumestleta recta (Guenée, 1852)
Feltia subterranea (Fabricius, 1794)
Galgula partita Guenée, 1852
Garella nilotica (Rogenhofer, 1881)
Helicoverpa zea (Boddie, 1850)
Heliothis virescens (Fabricius, 1777)
Hypena minualis (Guénée, 1854)
Hypena scabra (Fabricius, 1798)
Leucania subpunctata (Harvey, 1875)
Litoprosopus futilis (Grote & Robinson, 1868)
Megalographa biloba (Stephens, 1830)
Melipotis acontioides (Guenée, 1852)
Melipotis famelica (Guenée, 1852)
Mocis disseverans (Walker, 1858)
Mocis latipes (Guenée, 1852)
Mocis marcida (Guenée, 1852)
Mythimna unipuncta (Haworth, 1809)
Peridroma saucia (Hübner, 1808)
Rachiplusia ou (Guenée, 1852)
Schrankia macula (Druce, 1891)
Spodoptera dolichos (Fabricius, 1794)
Spodoptera eridania (Stoll, 1782)
Spodoptera exigua (Hübner, 1808)
Spodoptera frugiperda (J.E. Smith, 1797)
Spodoptera ornithogalli (Guenée, 1852)
Tetanolita mynesalis inaequalis Ferguson, Hilburn & Wright, 1991
Trichoplusia ni (Hübner, 1800-1803)
Zale fictilis (Guenée, 1852)
Zale lunata (Drury, 1773)

Plutellidae
Plutella xylostella (Linnaeus, 1758)

Pterophoridae
Emmelina monodactyla (Linnaeus, 1758)
Lantanophaga pusillidactyla (Walker, 1864)
Lioptilodes albistriolatus (Zeller, 1877)
Oidaematophorus lienigianus (Zeller, 1852)
Stenoptilodes brevipennis (Zeller, 1874)

Pyralidae
Achroia grisella (Fabricius, 1794)
Anagasta kuehniella (Zeller, 1879)
Atheloca subrufella (Hulst, 1887)
Cadra cautella (Walker, 1863)
Cassiana malacella Dyar, 1914
Cryptoblabes gnidiella (Millière, 1867)
Elasmopalpus lignosellus Zeller, 1848
Ephestiodes indentella (Dyar, 1915)
Fundella ignobilis Heinrich, 1945
Galleria mellonella (Linnaeus, 1758)
Hypargyria definitella (Zeller, 1881)
Ocrasa nostralis (Guenée, 1854)
Plodia interpunctella (Hübner, [1813])
Pyralis farinalis (Linnaeus, 1758)
Pyralis manihotalis Guenee, 1854

Sphingidae
Agrius cingulata (Fabricius, 1775)
Erinnyis ello (Linnaeus, 1758)
Manduca sexta (Linnaeus, 1763)
Pseudosphinx tetrio (Linnaeus, 1771)
Xylophanes tersa (Linnaeus, 1771)

Tineidae
Erechthias minuscula (Walsingham, 1897)
Lepyrotica scardamyctis Meyrick, 1921
Nemapogon granella (Linnaeus, 1758)
Niditinea fuscella (Linnaeus, 1758)
Niditinea praeumbrata (Meyrick, 1919)
Oenoe euphrantis Meyrick, 1927
Opogona sacchari Bojer, 1856
Pompostolella charipepla (Meyrick, 1927)
Praeacedes atomosella (Walker, 1863)
Protodarcia haliplancta (Meyrick, 1927)
Setomorpha rutella Zeller, 1852
Tinea minutella Fabricius, 1794
Tinea pellionella (Linnaeus, 1758)
Tineola bisselliella (Hummel, 1823)
Xystrologa antipathetica (Forbes, 1931)
A Monopis species

Tortricidae
Aethes seriatana (Zeller, 1875)
Argyrotaenia velutinana (Walker, 1863)
Bactra verutana Zeller, 1875
Coniostola procellosa (Meyrick, 1917)
Crocidosema lantana Busck, 1910
Crocidosema plebejana Zeller, 1847
Endothenia hebesana (Walker, 1863)
Epiblema strenuana (Walker, 1863)
Episimus argutanus (Clemens, 1860)
Episimus tyrius Heinrich, 1923
Episimus species
Grapholitini species
Sparganothis sulfureana (Clemens, 1860)
Strepsicrates smithiana Walsingham, 1892

Yponomeutidae
Yponomeuta calcarata Meyrick, 1924

References
 

'
lepidoptera
Bermuda
'
'
Bermuda
Bermuda